Memphis Conference is one of the 72 Conferences (or middle judicatories) of the United Methodist Church. It consists of seven districts and 410 churches in West Tennessee and the Jackson Purchase area of western Kentucky. William T. McAlilly is the Resident Bishop. 

The Memphis Conference Website at http://www.Memphis-UMC.net contains links to each of the 4 districts and 410 churches, ministry directories, conference news and information, and a variety of other resources.

Districts
The 4 Districts of the Memphis Conference are:

Metro

Mississippi River

Purchase

Tennessee River

See also

Le Bonheur Children's Medical Center

Methodism in Kentucky
Methodism in Tennessee
United Methodist Church